Jewel is a novel by Bret Lott, and was chosen as an Oprah's Book Club selection.

Plot introduction
The year is 1943 and life is good for Jewel Hilburn, her husband, Leston, and their five children. Although there's a war going on, the Mississippi economy is booming, providing plenty of business for the hardworking family. Even the news that eldest son James has enlisted is mitigated by the fact that Jewel, now pushing 40, is pregnant with one last child. Her joy is slightly clouded, however, when her childhood friend Cathedral arrives at the door with a troubling prophecy: "I say unto you that the baby you be carrying be yo' hardship, be yo' test in this world. This be my prophesying unto you, Miss Jewel."

When the child is finally born, it seems that Cathedral's prediction was empty: the baby appears normal in every way. As the months go by, however, Jewel becomes increasingly afraid that something is wrong with little Brenda Kay—she doesn't cry, she doesn't roll over, she's hardly ever awake. Eventually husband and wife take the baby to the doctor and are informed that she is a "Mongolian Idiot," not expected to live past the age of 2. Jewel angrily rebuffs the doctor's suggestion that they institutionalize Brenda Kay. Instead, the Hilburns shoulder the burdens—and discover the unexpected joys—of living with a Down syndrome child.

Film, TV or theatrical adaptations
 In 2001 made into a TV movie, starring Farrah Fawcett in the title role.

References

1991 American novels
Novels set in Mississippi
Novels set in the 1940s
American novels adapted into films
American novels adapted into television shows
Books about Down syndrome
Fiction set in 1943